Brian Yang may refer to
 Brian Yang (producer)
 Brian Yang (badminton)